Nuichua is a genus of Asian stick insects in the tribe Necrosciini, erected by J Bresseel and J Constant, in 2018.  To date (2022) the sole species has been recorded from Vietnam.

Species
The Phasmida Species File currently only includes Nuichua rabaeyae Bresseel & Constant, 2018: the genus was named after Núi Chúa National Park, where the type specimens were found.

References

External links

Phasmatodea genera
Phasmatodea of Asia
Lonchodidae